Hazelwick School is a co-educational comprehensive school with academy status for pupils aged 11 to 18, located in Crawley, West Sussex, England.

History

Hazelwick School was built in 1953 as part of developing Crawley as a new town and was opened as Hazelwick county secondary modern school in 1953. A further building was added in 1959, and in 1960 became a bilateral modern and grammar school, becoming a comprehensive school in 1964.

In 1971, the school reduced its age range to 12-18, as the area became a three-tier area, with provision for children in middle schools up until the age of twelve, and in 1984 the number of students attending was 1,675. In 2004, with the school once again took pupils aged eleven, at the beginning of year 7. In preparation for this latter change, the school had considerable work done to buildings. It had been thought that the school would form part of the local private finance initiative which re-built other local schools, but this was not to be the case.
A full-sized, floodlit, astroturf pitch was added in 2006. A new Learning Resource Centre, library, and specialist IT educational facility were added in 2007.

Academy status
At the start of August 2011, Hazelwick School became an academy in line with new laws passed by the government. Academy status was sought due to the school governing body and parental community wanting to have independent control over the school, believing that in the long run the school itself (and the governing body) is best placed to make decisions about its future development.

Students
The school caters for around 2000 pupils who are separated into 7 different years within the school. Years 7 to 8 study at Key Stage 3 which acts as the foundation knowledge of their educational career. Years 9 to 11 study at Key Stage 4 where pupils study to obtain a variety of qualifications such as; GCSEs, BTECs, NVQs and some pupils can even take A Levels. At Hazelwick's sixth form, approximately 400 students are taught at Key Stage 5 which provides several qualifications for students to obtain, with the main being A Levels. A range of other higher level awards such as BTEC and NVQ are also offered by the school.

Curriculum
The school is a specialist technology college having specialisms in humanities and technology. It was awarded the Naacemark for schools, recognising the school's success in developing and implementing a strategic approach to ICT.

Although specialised the school offers a vast range of subjects within the curriculum, from core subjects such as maths, science and English to subjects such as drama, electronics, art, music, ICT and more.

Sister School
Hazelwick School is twinned with Aggrey School in Ghana. This twinning was, until Ann Fearon's appointment as head teacher of the school, celebrated with alternating annual trips being made by sixth formers and teachers. During the visit by Aggrey to Hazelwick, a week of events to do with the cultural aspects of Ghana take place throughout the school to further ties between the two schools.

Notable former pupils
 Erin Doherty, actress, Jessie March in Call the Midwife (2017), Fabienne in Les Misérables (2018), Princess Anne in The Crown (2019).
 Alex Mayer, Member of the European Parliament (2016–2019)
 Laura Moffatt, Former Member of Parliament for Crawley (1997–2010)
 Mike Hazlewood, musician, co-writer of "The Air That I Breathe" recorded by The Hollies 
 Philip Lawson, singer, composer, arranger, baritone with The King's Singers (1994–present) 
 Grace Saif, actress known for Doctors and the Netflix show 13 Reasons Why.
 Gareth Southgate, England manager (from 2016), former England football player, and Middlesbrough manager/player.
 Dan Walker, BBC breakfast presenter, former sports presenter, born and raised in Crawley.
David Tong, Professor of Theoretical Physics, University of Cambridge.
Sam Twomey, Former rugby player for Harlequins and London Irish.

Notable former teachers
 Romesh Ranganathan, comedian (head of sixth form and maths teacher). His now wife Leesa was teaching drama at the school at the time.

References

External links 
Official Website
Ofsted Report

Secondary Schools in Crawley
Academies in West Sussex
Buildings and structures in Crawley
Secondary schools in West Sussex
People educated at Hazelwick School